James Powers (October 1785 – January 3, 1868) was an American lawyer and politician from New York.

Life
He was the son of William Powers (c. 1745–1796) and Rhoda (Deane) Powers (1759–1828). He married Nancy Day (1787–1826), and they had three daughters.

He was a member of the New York State Assembly (Greene Co.) in 1816 and 1822.

He was a member of the New York State Senate (3rd D.) from 1836 to 1839, sitting in the 59th, 60th, 61st and 62nd New York State Legislatures.

He was a delegate to the New York State Constitutional Convention of 1846.

He was buried at the Village Cemetery in Catskill.

His daughter Frances (1815–1854) was married to Nelson Beardsley (1807–1894), son of State Senator John Beardsley.

Sources
The New York Civil List compiled by Franklin Benjamin Hough (pages 58, 131f, 144, 190, 198 and 298; Weed, Parsons and Co., 1858)

External links

1785 births
1868 deaths
Democratic Party New York (state) state senators
People from Catskill, New York
Democratic Party members of the New York State Assembly
New York (state) Federalists
19th-century American politicians